Gro Sissel Gulden (born 30 October 1939) is a Norwegian mycologist.

She was hired as a curator at the Natural History Museum at the University of Oslo in 1967, and was promoted to professor in 2001. She retired in the autumn of 2006. A replacement curator has not been found as of early 2009. Gulden has published several books, both academic, popular and for children. Her research has been focused largely on the taxonomy of agaric mushrooms, especially the family Tricholomataceae and the genus Galerina. She also has published several articles about alpine and arctic macromycetes.

Selected works

References

1939 births
Living people
Norwegian mycologists
Academic staff of the University of Oslo